Alexandria is the capital city of the Teleorman County, Muntenia, Romania. It is located south-west of Bucharest, towards the Bulgarian border, and has over 45,000 inhabitants. The 44th parallel north passes just north of the city.

Geography
Alexandria is situated in the middle of the Wallachian Plain, on the banks of the Vedea River.

The city is traversed by the national road DN6, which links Bucharest to the Banat region in western Romania; the road is part of European route E70. The Alexandria train station serves the CFR Line 909, with service towards Roșiorii de Vede (to the northwest) and Zimnicea (to the south, on the Danube).

History
Alexandria was named after its founder, Alexandru D. Ghica, Prince of Wallachia from April 1834 to 7 October 1842. Its population in 1900 was 1,675. Grain, which was Alexandria's main trade at the time, was dispatched both by rail to the Danubian port of Zimnicea and by river to Giurgiu.

In 1989, the city had over 63,000 inhabitants and more than six large factories. A 2020 estimate puts the population at 49,878.

Education
There are three high schools in Alexandria: the Alexandru D. Ghica National College, the Alexandru Ioan Cuza Theoretical High School, and the Constantin Noica Theoretical High School. 

In 1897, the Ștefan cel Mare School moved from its former location to 310 Libertății Street; a local entrepreneur, M. Frangulea, obtained the plot and hired renowned architect Alexandru Săvulescu to build the new boys' primary school for the city.

Religion
The Diocese of Alexandria and Teleorman is a diocese of the Romanian Orthodox Church.

Sports
CSM Alexandria is a football club founded in 1948; it plays in the Romanian Liga III. CS Universitatea Alexandria is a women's football club founded in 2012. Stadionul Municipal, which holds 5,000 people, is the home ground for both clubs; the stadium is currently undergoing reconstruction. The Alexandria women's basketball team plays in the Liga Națională.

Natives
 Valentin Badea (b. 1982), footballer
 Dan Balauru (b. 1980), footballer
  (b. 1966), fashion creator
  (1899–1976), mayor, lawyer, writer
 Anghel Demetriescu (1847–1903), historian
 Gheorghe Mihăilescu (1888–?), World War I pilot
 Ciprian Manolescu (b. 1978), mathematician
 Andreea Ogrăzeanu (b. 1990), sprinter
 Florin Olteanu (b. 1981), footballer
 Sorin Paraschiv (b. 1981), footballer
 Alin Pencea (b. 1992), footballer
 Marin Stan (b. 1950), sports shooter
 Alina Tecșor (b. 1979), tennis player
 Alin Toșca (b. 1992), footballer
 Daniel Tudor (b. 1974), footballer
 Ionuț Voicu (b. 1984), footballer

Gallery

References

External links

 
Cities in Romania
Capitals of Romanian counties
Planned cities in Romania
Populated places in Teleorman County
Localities in Muntenia